Gambill is a surname. Notable people with the surname include:

Jan-Michael Gambill (born 1977), American tennis player
Robert Gambill (born 1955), opera singer
Shauna Gambill (born 1976), American beauty queen
Tammy Gambill (born 1957), American figure skater and coach